The 1935–36 season was Mansfield Town's fifth season in the Football League and fourth in the Third Division North, they finished in 19th position with 37 points.

Final league table

Results

Football League Third Division North

FA Cup

Football League Third Division North Cup

Squad statistics
 Squad list sourced from

References
General
 Mansfield Town 1935–36 at soccerbase.com (use drop down list to select relevant season)

Specific

Mansfield Town F.C. seasons
Mansfield Town